John Shivers is a theatrical sound designer based in New York, United States. 
Shivers specialises in the design of sound systems for musical theatre productions on Broadway and internationally.

Career
Shivers was the recipient of the 2013 Tony Award for Best Sound Design of a Musical for his work on the Broadway musical Kinky Boots. Shivers was also nominated for the 2009 Drama Desk Award for Outstanding Sound Design for his work on 9 to 5.

Broadway productions
Shivers has worked on the following productions on Broadway:

 "Pretty Woman" (2018)
 "Gettin' The Band Back Together" (2018)
 "Paramour" (2016)
 "Holler If Ya Hear Me" (2014)
 "Soul Doctor" (2013)
 "Kinky Boots" (2013)
 "Leap of Faith" (2012)
 "Bonnie and Clyde" (2011)
 "Hugh Jackman, Back on Broadway (2011)
 "Sister Act" (2011)
 "9 to 5 (2009)
 "Cat on a Hot Tin Roof (2008)
 "The Little Mermaid" (2008)
 "Disney's Tarzan" (2006)
 "In My Life" (2005)

International 
As part of his international career, Shivers has taken part in the following productions:

 "The Lion King" Paris (2021)
 "The Beauty and the Beast" UK Tour (2021)
 "Wicked" Hamburg (2021)
 "The Beauty and the Beast" Shanghai (2018)
 "Lion King" International Tour (2018)
 "Kinky Boots" Hamburg (2017)
 "The Secret" Shanghai (2016)
 "Tarzan" Oberhausen (2016)
 "Lion King" Shanghai (2016)
 "Kinky Boots" London (2015)
 "Lion King" Mexico City (2015)
 "Das Wunder Von Bern" Hamburg (2014)

Regional 
 "Trading Places" Alliance Theater (2022)
 "Afterwords" The 5th Ave Theater (2022)
 "The Wanderer" Paper Mill Playhouse (2022)
 "Becoming Nancy" Alliance Theater (2020)
 "Rock of Ages" The 5th Ave Theater (2019)
 "Heart of Rock and Roll" Old Globe (2018)
 "Hood" Dallas Theater Center (2017)
 "Born For This" The Broad Stage (2017)
 "Merrily We Roll Along" Huntington (2017)
 "Moonshine" Dallas Theater Center (2016)
 "First Wive's Club" Chicago (2015)
 "Harmony" CTG Los Angeles (2014)

MUNY St Louis 
2015:
2016:
2017:
2018:
2019:
2021:
2022:

References 

Year of birth missing (living people)
Living people
American theatre people
American sound designers
Broadway sound designers
Tony Award winners